José Antonio Magriñá Rodeiro (14 December 1917 — 2 August 1988) was a Cuban footballer.

International career
He represented Cuba at the 1938 FIFA World Cup, scoring a goal against Romania.

References

1917 births
1988 deaths
Cuban footballers
Cuba international footballers
1938 FIFA World Cup players
Association football forwards